Chios Island National Airport  is an airport on the island of Chios in Greece. It is also known as Chios National Airport, "Omiros" or Chios Airport located at the region of Kampos, south of the city of Chios. Aircraft up to the size of Airbus A320 are able to land at the airport.

History
The government-owned airport in Chios is found in the coastal area of the eastern department of the island. Its operations began on 4 August 1969 with Olympic Airways Flight OA560 from Athens. The runway was built with a length of 1,511 x 30 meters, and has not been extended since its construction.

Airlines and destinations
The following airlines operate regular scheduled and charter flights at Chios Island Airport:

Statistics

See also
Transport in Greece

References

External links
 
 

Airports in Greece
Buildings and structures in Chios